The Norwegian Kven Organization was established in 1987, and has about 700 members. The organization has local branches in Skibotn, Børselv, Nord-Varanger, Tana, Lakselv, Alta, northern Troms, Tromsø, and Østlandet.

The tasks of the organization include working for a government report about the history and rights of the Kven people, improving the media coverage of Kven issues, and for the Norwegian government to establish a State Secretary for Kven issues. In addition, its goals include establishing reading and writing classes at the beginner to advanced level and a Kven kindergarten, and to incorporate the Kven language at all levels of education in Norway. It also aims to establish a Kven culture fund, road and other signs in Kven, Kven names on official maps, and museums and centers for Kven language and culture.

References

External links
 Official website

Kven culture
Organisations based in Tromsø
Indigenous organisations in Norway
1987 establishments in Norway